Epidendrum serpens is a sympodial pseudobulbous orchid that grows among lichens on trees near the tree line at altitudes of 1.6-3.5 km in Peru and Ecuador, including the states of Azuay and Pichincha.

Description 
The flattened oblong cylindrical pseudobulbs grow to 2 cm long and bear one or two to three leaves.  The short, terminal, racemose inflorescence bears three to seven rather large flowers, up to 2 cm across, colored deep violet (Reichenbach) to wine-red (Dodson & Dodson).  The lip is heart-shaped where it diverges from the apex of the column, is bolobate at the apex, bears a low keel down the middle, and is slightly fringed on the edge.

References 

serpens
Orchids of Ecuador
Orchids of Peru